Sidi Amor Mosque, also known as the Sidi Amor small mosque  is a Tunisian mosque located in the south of the medina of Tunis.It is an official historical monument since November 16, 1928.

Localization
The mosque is located in 24 the Sidi Ali Azzouz Street. It got its name from the saint Sidi Amor Al Batach who was born in La Marsa and who was buried in the mosque in 1526.

References 

Mosques in Tunis
19th-century mosques